

Belarus 
 Syarhey Chernik – Nancy – 2016–17
 Sergey Krivets – Metz – 2014–15

Belgium
 Brandon Baiye – Clermont – 2022–23
 Michy Batshuayi – Marseille – 2014–16
 Roberto Bisconti – Nice – 2004–06
 Gilbert Bodart – Bordeaux 1996–97
 Danny Boffin – Metz – 1997–2000
 Toni Brogno – Sedan – 2000–02
 Gust Brouwers – Excelsior Roubaix – 1934–36
 Christian Brüls – Nice, Rennes – 2013–15
 Maxime Busi – Reims – 2021–
 Yannick Carrasco – Monaco – 2013–15
 Maximiliano Caufriez – Clermont – 2022–
 Jurgen Cavens – Marseille – 2001–02
 Nacer Chadli – Monaco – 2018–19
 Laurent Ciman – Dijon – 2018–19
 Thibault De Smet – Reims – 2020–
 Eric Deflandre – Lyon – 2000–04
 Brecht Dejaegere – Toulouse – 2022–
 Stéphane Demol – Toulouse FC – 1990–91
 Jason Denayer – Lyon – 2018–22
 Philippe Desmet – Lille – 1986–89
 Brandon Deville – AC Ajaccio – 2013–14
 Jérémy Doku – Rennes – 2020–
 Grégory Dufer – Caen – 2004–05
 Steve Dugardein – Caen – 2004–05
 Yassine El Ghanassy – Nantes – 2017–18
 Renaud Emond – Nantes – 2019–22
 Björn Engels – Reims – 2018–19
 Wout Faes – Reims – 2020–22
 Thomas Foket – Reims – 2018–
 Guillaume Gillet – SC Bastia, Nantes – 2014–17
 Roland Godart – CO Roubaix-Tourcoing – 1950–52
 Fernand Goyvaerts – Nice – 1968–69, 1970–71
 Baptiste Guillaume – Lens, Lille, Angers, Nîmes – 2014–16, 2017–19
 Eden Hazard – Lille – 2007–12
 Nordin Jbari – Troyes – 1999-01
 Joris Kayembe – Nantes – 2017–18
 Christophe Kinet – Strasbourg – 1997–99
 Roland Lamah – Le Mans – 2008–10
 Christophe Lauwers – Toulouse – 1998–99
 Dominique Lemoine – Mulhouse – 1989–90
 Philippe Léonard – Monaco, Nice – 1996–2004
 Aaron Leya Iseka – Marseille, Toulouse, Metz – 2016–17, 2018–21
 Anthony Limbombe – Nantes – 2018–21
 Dodi Lukebakio – Toulouse – 2016–17
 Eliot Matazo – Monaco – 2020–
 Isaac Mbenza – Montpellier, Amiens – 2016–18, 2019–20
 Thomas Meunier – Paris SG – 2016–20
 Robert Meuris – CO Roubaix-Tourcoing, AS Monaco, Nîmes Olympique – 1947–52, 1953–55
 Raphaël Miceli – Strasbourg, Le Havre – 1997–00
 Kevin Mirallas – Lille, Saint-Étienne – 2004–10
 Amadou Onana – Lille – 2021–22
 Loïs Openda – Lens – 2022–
 Divock Origi – Lille – 2012–14
 Stef Peeters – Caen – 2017–19
 Luigi Pieroni – Auxerre, Nantes, Lens, Valenciennes – 2004–10
 Thierry Pister – Toulon – 1989–90
 Gaston Plovie  – Excelsior Roubaix, RC Roubaix, Sète – 1932–35, 1936–38
 David Pollet – Lens – 2007–08, 2010–11
 Pascal Renier – Troyes – 1999–2001
 Rubenilson – Nice – 1996–97
 Enzo Scifo – Bordeaux, Auxerre, Monaco – 1988–91, 1993–97
 Matz Sels – Strasbourg – 2018–
 Benoît Thans – Lens – 1987–89
 Arthur Theate – Rennes – 2022–
 Youri Tielemans – Monaco – 2017–19
 Daniel Van Buyten – Marseille – 2001–03
 Erwin Vandenbergh – Lille – 1986–90
 Erwin Vandendaele – Reims – 1977–78
 Leo Van der Elst – Metz – 1988–89
 Mike Van Hamel – Le Havre – 2008–09
 Gunter Van Handenhoven – Metz – 1998-02
 Joseph Van Mool – Nice – 1961–64, 1965–68
 Anthony Vanden Borre – Montpellier – 2016–17
 Franky Vercauteren – Nantes – 1987–90
 Julien Vercauteren – Nice – 2014–15
 Patrick Vervoort – Bordeaux – 1990–91
 Eddy Voordeckers – Rennes – 1985–87
 Marc Wilmots – Bordeaux 2000–01
 Laurent Wuillot – Ajaccio – 2002–03

Benin
 Khaled Adénon – Le Mans, Amiens – 2008–09, 2017–19
 Jordan Adéoti – Caen – 2014–17
 Jean-Marc Adjovi-Bocco – Lens – 1991–97
 Yannick Aguemon – Toulouse – 2011–12
Mattéo Ahlinvi – Nîmes – 2020–21
 Saturnin Allagbé – Dijon – 2020–21
 Sessi D'Almeida – Bordeaux – 2014–15
 Laurent D'Jaffo – Montpellier HSC – 1991–95
 David Djigla – Bordeaux – 2014–15
 Jodel Dossou – Clermont – 2021–23
Rudy Gestede – Metz – 2007-08
 Cédric Hountondji – Rennes, Clermont, Angers – 2013–14, 2021–
 Emmanuel Imorou – Caen – 2014–17, 2018–19
 Steve Mounié – Montpellier, Brest – 2015–17, 2020–
 Mickaël Poté – Nice – 2009–12
 Stéphane Sessègnon – Le Mans, Paris SG, Montpellier – 2006–11, 2016–18
 Oumar Tchomogo – Guingamp – 2003–04
 Jonathan Tinhan – Grenoble, Montpellier, Troyes – 2009–10, 2011–14, 2017–18
 Olivier Verdon – Bordeaux – 2017–18

Bosnia and Herzegovina
 Anel Ahmedhodžić – Bordeaux – 2021–22
 Boško Antić – Angers 1972–75
 Alen Bajkuša – Caen 1996–97
 Mehmed Baždarević – Sochaux – 1988–95
 Boban Božovic – Lens – 1991–92
 Adnan Čustović – Le Havre – 1998–00
 Esad Dugalić – Saint-Étienne – 1976–77
 Haris Duljević – Nîmes – 2019–21
 Vinko Golob – Toulouse FC (1937) – 1948–49
 Faruk Hadžibegić – Sochaux – 1988–95
 Vahid Halilhodžić – Nantes, Paris SG – 1981–87
 Vedad Ibišević – Paris SG – 2004–05
 Dragan Jakovljević – Nantes – 1989–91
 Božo Janković – Metz – 1981–82
 Josip Katalinski – Nice – 1975–78
 Sead Kolašinac – Marseille – 2022–
 Muhamed Konjić – Monaco – 1998–99
 Petar Manola – Red Star – 1947–48
 Mirza Mešić – Nantes – 1999–2000
Danijel Milićević – Metz – 2017–18
 Muhamed Mujić – Bordeaux – 1962–63
 Vahidin Musemić – Nice – 1974–76
 Džemaludin Mušović – Valenciennes – 1976–77
 Simo Nikolić – Lyon – 1980–83
 Ivica Osim – Strasbourg, Sedan, Valenciennes – 1970–71, 1972–74, 1975–76, 1977–78
 Miralem Pjanić – Metz, Lyon – 2007–08, 2008–11
 Sanjin Prcić - Sochaux, Rennes, Strasbourg – 2013–15, 2016–
 Boro Primorac – Lille, Cannes – 1983–86, 1987–90
 Halid Šabanović – Angers – 2022–
 Alen Škoro – Marseille – 2000–01
 Blaž Slišković – Marseille, Lens, Mulhouse, Rennes – 1986–87, 1988–90, 1991–92
 Edhem Šljivo – Nice – 1981–82
 Emir Spahić – Montpellier – 2009–10
 Safet Sušić – Paris SG – 1982–91
 Mirza Varešanović – Bordeaux – 1995–96

Brazil
 Adaílton (Adaílton da Silva Santos) – AS Nancy – 2005–08
 Adaílton (Adaílton José dos Santos Filho) – Rennes – 2004–06
 Adaílton (Adaílton Martins Bolzan) – Paris SG – 1998–99
 Adeílson – Nice – 2008–09
 Adriano – Monaco – 2007–11
 Adryan – Nantes – 2015–16
 Airton – Stade Français – 1966–67
 Alex (Alex Dias de Almeida) – Saint-Étienne, Paris SG – 1999–2002
 Alex (Alex Rodrigo Dias da Costa) – Paris SG – 2011–14
Alexsandro – Lille – 2022–
 Aloísio – Saint-Étienne, Paris SG – 1999–2003
 Dani Alves – Paris SG – 2017–19
 Yeso Amalfi – Nice, RC Paris, Marseille – 1950–51, 1954–56, 1957–58
 Leandro Amaral – Istres – 2004–05
 Anderson – Lyon – 2007–08
 Elinton Andrade – Marseille – 2009–12
 André Luís – Marseille – 2005–06
 André Luiz (André Luiz Moreira) – Marseille, Paris SG, Ajaccio – 2001–03, 2004–06
 André Luiz (André Luiz Silva do Nascimento) – AS Nancy – 2005–13
 Antônio Carlos – Ajaccio – 2005–06
 Assis – Montpellier – 2001–02
Danilo Avelar – Amiens – 2017–18
 Baltazar – Rennes – 1991–92
 Danilo Barbosa – Nice – 2018–22
 Michel Bastos – Lille OSC, Lyon – 2006–13
 César Belli – Paris SG, Rennes – 1999–2002
 Bolívar – Monaco – 2006–08
 António Borges – Cannes, Antibes – 1935–36, 1938–39
Neto Borges – Clermont – 2022–
Gabriel Boschilia – Monaco, Nantes – 2015–20
 Abel Braga – Paris SG – 1979–81
 Brandão – Marseille, Saint-Étienne – 2008–14
 Brandãozinho – Nice – 1953–56
 Claudio Caçapa – Lyon – 2000–07
 Jonathan Cafu – Bordeaux – 2017–18
Caio Henrique – Monaco – 2020–
 Flávio Camargo – Bastia – 1994–95
 Joel Camargo – Paris SG – 1971–72
 Diogo Campos – Evian – 2012–13
 Carlão – Sochaux – 2008–14
 Carlos Eduardo – Nice – 2014–15
 Carlos Henrique – Bordeaux – 2005–14
 Carlos Vinícius – Monaco – 2018–19
 Matheus Carvalho – Monaco – 2014–15
 Ceará – Paris SG – 2007–12
 Christian – Paris SG, Bordeaux – 1999–2002
 Eduardo Costa – Bordeaux, Marseille, AS Monaco – 2001–05, 2009–10
 Cris – Lyon – 2004–12
 Cuca – Saint-Étienne – 1995–96
 Dalbert – Nice, Rennes – 2016–17, 2020–21
 Dante – Lille, Nice – 2003–05, 2016–
 David Luiz – Paris Saint-Germain – 2014–16
 Deivid – Bordeaux – 2003–04
 Denílson – Bordeaux – 2005–06
 Diego Carlos – Nantes – 2016–19
 Dill – Marseille – 2001–02
 Dória – Marseille – 2016–18
 Douglão – Nantes – 2008–09
 Dudu Cearense – Rennes – 2004–06
 Ederson – Nice, Lyon – 2004–08, 2008–12
 Edmílson (Edmílson Gomes) – Lyon – 2001–04
 Edmílson (Edmílson Gonçalves) – Paris SG – 1997–98
 Edson (Edson Luís da Silva) – Marseille – 1998–99
 Édson (Édson Marcelo de Faria Manfron) – Ajaccio – 2004–06
 Eduardo (Eduardo Adelino da Silva) – Toulouse FC – 2003–05
 Eduardo (Eduardo Ribeiro dos Santos) – Lens, Ajaccio – 2009–14
 Emerson (Emerson da Conceição) – Lille OSC – 2006–11
 Emerson (Emerson Ricardo Otacilio) – Lorient – 1998–99
 Everson – Nice – 2002–04
 Fabinho (Fábio Alves Félix) – Toulouse FC – 2006–07
 Fabinho (Fábio Henrique Tavares) – Monaco – 2013–18
 Fábio – Nantes – 2018–22
 Faustinho – Sedan – 1961–62
 Fernandão – Marseille, Toulouse FC – 2001–04
 Fernando Cônsul Fernandes – Valenciennes – 1967–68
 Demetrius Ferreira – AS Nancy, Bastia, Marseille, Troyes – 1998–2007
 Francisco Filho – Nîmes Olympique – 1966–67
 Fransérgio – Bordeaux – 2021–22
 Fred – Lyon – 2005–09
 Adriano Gabiru – Marseille – 2000–01
 Gabriel – Lille, Troyes – 2016–20
 Ganso – Amiens – 2018–19
 Géder – Le Mans – 2008–10
 Geninho – Bastia – 1970–71
 Geraldo – Paris SG – 1991–92
 Gerson – Marseille – 2021–23
 Gil – Valenciennes – 2011–12
 Giovane Élber – Lyon – 2003–04
 Fernando Giudicelli – Antibes – 1935–36
Andrei Girotto – Nantes – 2017–
 Ricardo Gomes – Paris SG – 1991–95
 Grafite – Le Mans – 2006–07
 Gralak – Bordeaux – 1996–98
 Bruno Guimarães – Lyon – 2019–22
 Hélder – Nancy – 2008–09, 2011–13
Henrique – Lyon – 2021–
 Hernani – Saint-Étienne – 2017–18
 Vitorino Hilton – Bastia, Lens, Marseille, Montpellier – 2003–21
 Ilan – Sochaux, Saint-Étienne, Ajaccio, Bastia – 2004–09, 2011–14
 Isaias – Metz – 1995–97
Ismaily – Lille – 2022–
 Jaguaré – Marseille – 1936–39
 Jairzinho – Marseille – 1974–75
 Léo Jardim – Lille – 2021–23
 Jean Lucas – Lyon, Brest, Monaco – 2019–
 Jemerson – Monaco, Metz – 2015–20, 2021–22
 Jeovânio – Valenciennes – 2006–09
João Victor – Nantes – 2022–
 Jorge – Monaco – 2016–18
 Jubal – AJ Auxerre – 2022–
 Júlio César – Brest, Montpellier – 1986–90
 Juninho – Lyon – 2001–09
 Jussiê – Lens, Bordeaux – 2005–16
 Kim – AS Nancy – 2005–08
 Leonardo – Paris SG – 1996–98
 Ruan Levine – Ajaccio – 2022–
 Lucas Lima – Nantes – 2016–19
 Luan – Toulouse – 2009–10
 Lucas Evangelista – Nantes – 2018–19
 Lucas – Rennes – 2000–02
 Luís Fabiano – Rennes – 2000–02
 Luís Henrique (Luís Henrique Pereira dos Santos) – Monaco – 1992–94
 Luis Henrique (Luís Henrique Tomaz de Lima) – Marseille – 2020–
 Luiz Alberto – Saint-Étienne – 2000–01
 Luiz Araújo – Lille – 2017–21
 Luiz Gustavo – Marseille – 2017–20
 Luizinho – Nîmes Olympique, Montpellier – 1974–82
 Thiago Maia – Lille – 2017–20
 Maicon – AS Monaco – 2004–06
 Malcom – Bordeaux – 2015–18
 Wallyson Mallmann – Nice – 2015–16
 Fernando Marçal – Guingamp, Lyon – 2016–20
 Marcelinho (Marcelo dos Santos) – Marseille – 2000–01
 Marcelinho (Marcelo Pereira Surcin) – Ajaccio – 2004–05
 Marcelo – Lyon – 1993–97
 Marcelo – Lyon, Bordeaux – 2017–22
 Marcos António – Auxerre – 2007–08
 Marcos Paulo – Le Mans – 2008–09
 Marlon – Nice – 2017–18
 Marquinhos – Paris Saint-Germain – 2013–
 Armando da Silva Martins – Lens – 1952–54
 William Matheus – Toulouse FC – 2014–16
 Maxwell – Paris Saint-Germain – 2012–17
 Túlio de Melo – Le Mans, Lille OSC, Evian – 2005–14
 Thiago Mendes – Lille, Lyon – 2017–
 Fernando Menegazzo – Bordeaux – 2005–11
 Miranda – Sochaux – 2005–06
 Paulo Miranda – Bordeaux – 2001–02, 2003–04
 Walquir Mota – Lille OSC – 1992–94
 Lucas Moura – Paris Saint-Germain – 2012–18
 Rafael Moura – Lorient – 2007–08
 Carlos Mozer – Marseille – 1989–92
 Naldo – Monaco – 2018–19
 Nathan – Amiens – 2017–18
 Nenê – Monaco, Paris SG – 2007–13
 Neymar – Paris Saint-Germain – 2017–
 Nivaldo – Saint-Étienne – 2007–08
 Vicente Nola – Saint-Étienne – 1951–53
 Magno Novaes – Bastia, Valenciennes – 2012–14
 Eduardo Oliveira – Sedan – 1999-01
 Valeriano de Oliveira – RC Lens – 1993–94
 Oswaldinho – Saint-Étienne – 1951–52
 Otávio – Bordeaux – 2017–22
 Pablo – Bordeaux – 2015–16, 2017–21
 Lucas Paquetá – Lyon – 2020–22
 Paulão – Saint-Étienne – 2011–12
 Paulo André – Le Mans – 2006–09
 Paulo César (Paulo César Arruda Parente) – Paris SG, Toulouse FC – 2002–09
 Paulo César (Paulo César Lima) – Marseille – 1974–75
 Pedro Henrique – Rennes – 2014–17
 Pena – Strasbourg – 2002–03
 Lucas Pereira – Ajaccio – 2004–06
 Matheus Pereira – Dijon – 2019–20
 Luan Peres – Marseille – 2021–22
 Constantino Pires – Nîmes Olympique, Marseille, Lyon – 1951–65
 Pita – Strasbourg – 1988–89
 Plinio – Bordeaux – 1969–70
 Rafael – Lyon – 2015–20
 Rafinha – Paris Saint-Germain – 2020–22
 Raí – Paris SG – 1993–98
 Raphinha – Rennes – 2019–21
 Rafael Ratão – Toulouse – 2022–
 Reinaldo – Paris SG – 2003–05
 Thiago Ribeiro – Bordeaux – 2004–05
 Ricardinho – Bordeaux – 1997–98
 Robson Bambu – Nice – 2020–
 Rodrigo – Ajaccio, Strasbourg – 2003–06, 2007–08
 Ronaldinho – Paris SG – 2001–03
 Rubens – Caen – 1991–92
 Carlos Ruiter – Bordeaux, AS Monaco – 1966–72, 1973–74
 Felipe Saad – Evian, AC Ajaccio, Caen – 2011–13, 2014–15
 Álvaro Santos – Sochaux, Strasbourg – 2006–08
 Éverton Santos – Paris SG – 2007–08
 Fábio Santos (Fábio dos Santos Barbosa) – Lyon – 2007–09
 Fábio Santos (Fábio Santos Romeu) – AS Monaco – 2007–08
 Márcio Santos – Bordeaux – 1992–94
 Sávio – Bordeaux – 2002–03
 Rafael Schmitz – Lille, Valenciennes – 2001–07, 2008–12
 Severo – Lens – 1952–54
 Célio Silva – Caen – 1993–94
 Gabriel Silva – Saint-Étienne – 2017–22
 Igor Silva – Lorient – 2021–
 Lucas Silva – Marseille – 2015–16
 Thiago Silva – Paris Saint-Germain – 2012–20
 Somália – Toulouse – 2015–18
 Sonny Anderson – Marseille, AS Monaco, Lyon – 1993–97, 1999–2003
 Souza – Paris SG – 2007–08
 Tetê – Lyon – 2021–23
 Matheus Thuler – Montpellier – 2021–22
 Vágner Love – Monaco – 2015–16
 Valdeir – Bordeaux – 1992–95
 Valdo – Paris SG – 1991–95
 Vampeta – Paris SG – 2000–01
 Vander – Rennes – 2000–01
 Vanderson – Monaco – 2021–
 Matheus Vivian – Metz – 2007–08
 Wallace – AS Monaco – 2014–16
 Weldon – Sochaux, Troyes – 2005–07
 Wendel – Bordeaux – 2006–11
 William – Bastia – 1995–96
 Agostinho Zara – Saint-Étienne – 1951–52
 Zé Alcino – AS Nancy – 1999–2000
 Nélson Zeglio – Sochaux, CO Roubaix-Tourcoing – 1951–53, 1954–55

Bulgaria
 Dimitri Antonov – CO Roubaix-Tourcoing, Sète – 1947–51, 1953–55
 Dimitar Berbatov – Monaco – 2013–15
 Georgi Dimitrov – Saint-Étienne – 1986–88
 Emil Gargorov – Strasbourg – 2007–08
 Nikolay Iliev – Rennes – 1994–95
 Georgi Ivanov – Rennes – 2002–04
 Yordan Letchkov – Marseille – 1996–97
 Vladimir Manchev – Lille OSC – 2002–04
 Plamen Markov – Metz – 1985–87
 Penko Rafailov – Strasbourg – 1937–38
 Nasko Sirakov – Lens – 1992–93
 Georgi Slavkov – Saint-Étienne – 1986–87
 Nikolay Todorov – Montpellier – 1991–92
 Boycho Velichkov – Le Havre – 1986–87
 Hristo Yanev – Grenoble – 2008–09
 Andrey Zhelyazkov – Strasbourg – 1985–86

Burkina Faso
 Habib Bamogo – Montpellier, Marseille, Nantes, Nice – 2001–05, 2006–11
 Cyrille Bayala – Ajaccio – 2022–
 Kouamé Botué – Ajaccio – 2022–
 Abdoulaye Cissé – Montpellier – 2001–04
 Henoc Conombo – Bastia – 2004–05
 Bryan Dabo – Montpellier, Saint-Étienne – 2009–10, 2012–18
 Moumouni Dagano – Guingamp, Sochaux – 2003–04, 2005–08
 Charles Kaboré – Marseille – 2007–13
 Issa Kaboré – Troyes, Marseille – 2021–
 Hervé Koffi – Lille – 2017–18
 Djakaridja Koné – Evian – 2012–15
 Anthony Koura – Nancy – 2016–17
Préjuce Nakoulma – Nantes – 2016–18
Abou Ouattara – Lille – 2019–20
Dango Ouattara – Lorient – 2021–23
 Issicka Ouattara – Angers, Mulhouse, Strasbourg – 1974–75, 1976–77, 1982–84
 Hermann Ouédraogo – Istres – 2004–05
 Fadil Sido – Metz – 2014–15
 Alain Traoré – Auxerre, Lorient, Monaco  – 2006–16
 Bertrand Traoré – Lyon – 2017–20
 Steeve Yago – Toulouse – 2012–18

Burundi
 Youssouf Ndayishimiye – Nice – 2022–
 Saidi Ntibazonkiza – Caen – 2015–16

References and notes

Books

Club pages
AJ Auxerre former players
AJ Auxerre former players
Girondins de Bordeaux former players
Girondins de Bordeaux former players
Les ex-Tangos (joueurs), Stade Lavallois former players
Olympique Lyonnais former players
Olympique de Marseille former players
FC Metz former players
AS Monaco FC former players
Ils ont porté les couleurs de la Paillade... Montpellier HSC Former players
AS Nancy former players
FC Nantes former players
Paris SG former players
Red Star Former players
Red Star former players
Stade de Reims former players
Stade Rennais former players
CO Roubaix-Tourcoing former players
AS Saint-Étienne former players
Sporting Toulon Var former players

Others

stat2foot
footballenfrance
French Clubs' Players in European Cups 1955-1995, RSSSF
Finnish players abroad, RSSSF
Italian players abroad, RSSSF
Romanians who played in foreign championships
Swiss players in France, RSSSF
EURO 2008 CONNECTIONS: FRANCE, Stephen Byrne Bristol Rovers official site

References

Notes

France
 
Association football player non-biographical articles